Ahmadabad (also Romanized as Aḩmadābād; also known as Khrābeh Badlān) is a village in Firuraq Rural District, in the Central District of Khoy County, West Azerbaijan Province, Iran. At the 2006 census, its population was 191, in 31 families.

References 

Populated places in Khoy County